Sabadel-Latronquière is a commune in the Lot department in south-western France.
In the village centre there is a church dedicated to St Martial, a library (bibliothèque municipale) and a village hall (maison des associations).

Population

See also
Communes of the Lot department

References

Sabadellatronquiere